Tonga competed at the 2018 Commonwealth Games in the Gold Coast, Australia from 4 to 15 April 2018.

The Tongan team consisted of 13 athletes (seven men and six women) that competed in six sports. Boxer Magan Maka was the country's flag bearer during the opening ceremony.

Competitors
The following is the list of number of competitors participating at the Games per sport/discipline.

Athletics (track and field)

Tonga participated with a team of 2 athletes (1 man and 1 woman).

Track & road events

Field events

Boxing

Tonga participated with a team of 5 athletes (3 men and 2 women).

Lawn bowls

Tonga will compete in Lawn bowls.

Shooting

Tonga participated with one male athlete.

Swimming

Tonga participated with a team of 2 swimmers (1 man and 1 woman).

Weightlifting

Tonga participated with 1 athlete (1 man).

See also
Tonga at the 2018 Summer Youth Olympics
Tonga at the 2018 Winter Olympics

References

Nations at the 2018 Commonwealth Games
Tonga at the Commonwealth Games
2018 in Tongan sport